Maureen Stapleton is an American politician from Michigan, and a former teacher. She is a Democratic former member of Michigan House of Representatives from District 4.

Education 
Stapleton earned a BS degree in Psychology from Howard University in Washington, D.C. Stapleton was a member of Alpha Kappa Alpha sorority.

Career 
Stapleton was a teacher with Detroit Public Schools. Stapleton was an Administrator for the City of Indianapolis' Compliance Division. In 2003, Stapleton started a consulting business.

In the August 2006 primary election, Stapleton was seeking for a seat in District 4, but she was defeated by Coleman Young II. Stapleton lost by 928 votes.

On November 2, 2010, Stapleton won the election and became a member of the Michigan House of Representatives for District 4. Stapleton defeated Lillian Smith and Danetta Simpson with 94.89% of the votes. In the August 2012 primary election, Stapleton was seeking a seat in the newly created District 6, however, she was defeated by Rashida Tlaib. Stapleton lost by 683 votes.

See also 
 2010 Michigan House of Representatives election

References

External links 
 Maureen Stapleton at ballotpedia.org
 Maureen Stapleton links at housedems.com

21st-century American politicians
Living people
Democratic Party members of the Michigan House of Representatives
Women state legislators in Michigan
Educators from Michigan
American women educators
Howard University alumni
Year of birth missing (living people)
21st-century American women politicians